Blaenplwyf Halt railway station was a small railway station in a very rural location, the second stop after the junction for the Aberayron branch of the Carmarthen to Aberystwyth Line in the Welsh county of Ceredigion. Opened by the Lampeter, Aberayron and New Quay Light Railway, the branch to Aberayron diverged from the through line at Lampeter.

History
The branch was incorporated into the Great Western Railway during the Grouping of 1923, passing on to the Western Region of British Railways on nationalisation in 1948. Passenger services were discontinued in 1951, general freight in 1963 and milk traffic in 1973. The single platform does not survive, like most of the others it was built from wooden railway sleepers.

Notes

References

  
Great Western Railway Journal Vol 2 No 16 (Autumn 1995)

External links
 Blaenplwyf Halt
RAILSCOT on Lampeter, Aberayron and New Quay Light Railway

Former Great Western Railway stations
Disused railway stations in Ceredigion
Railway stations in Great Britain opened in 1911
Railway stations in Great Britain closed in 1951
1911 establishments in Wales